Zonked/Ain't It Fun is an album by Dee Dee Ramone. Zonked is the record released in America on the Other People's Music label, and Ain't It Fun is the version released in the UK on Blackout Records.

Lux Interior, Joey Ramone, and Marky Ramone made contributions to the album.

Ain't It Fun contains a bonus track, "Please Kill Me".

Track listing
 I'm Zonked, Los Hombres   
 Fix Yourself Up  
 I Am Seeing UFO's  (with Joey Ramone on vocals)
 Get Off Of The Scene   
 Never Never Again   
 Bad Horoscope   (with Lux Interior on vocals)
 It's So Bizarre   
 Get Out Of My Room   
 Someone Who Don't Fit In   
 Victim Of Society   
 My Chico   
 Disguises   
 Why Is Everybody Always Against Germany
 Please Kill Me (Bonus track only on Ain't It Fun)

References

Dee Dee Ramone albums
1996 albums